Close to You may refer to:

Film and television
Close to You (film), a 2006 Filipino film
Close to You: Remembering The Carpenters, a 1998 documentary film
"Close to You" (Heroes), a television episode

Music

Albums 
Close to You (The 88 album) or the title song, 2016
Close to You (The Carpenters album) or the title song (see below), 1970
Close to You (Father MC album) or the title song, 1992
Close to You (Frank Sinatra album) or the 1943 title song (see below), 1957
Close to You (Johnny Mathis album), 1970
Close to You (Sarah Vaughan album), 1960
Close to You, by Changmin, 2015
Close to You, or the title song (see below), by Fun Factory, 1995
Close to You, by Kate Wolf, 1980
Close to You, by The Lettermen, 1991

Songs 
"Close to You" (1943 song), written by Jerry Livingston, Carl Lampl, and Al Hoffman
"Close to You" (Fun Factory song), 1994
"Close to You" (Maxi Priest song), 1990
"Close to You" (Tohoshinki song), 2008
"Close to You" (Whigfield song), 1995
"(They Long to Be) Close to You", written by Burt Bacharach and Hal David, first recorded by Richard Chamberlain, 1963; covered by the Carpenters (1970) and others
"Close to You", by Andrew Hyatt from Four Good Years
"Close to You", by the Avalanches from Since I Left You
"Close to You", by Ayumi Hamasaki from Rainbow
"Close to You", by BeBe & CeCe Winans from Still
"Close to You", by the Brand New Heavies
"Close to You", by DJ Tiësto from In My Memory
"Close to You", by Fergie from The Dutchess
"Close to You", by Frank Ocean from Blonde
"Close to You", by Frost
"Close to You", by JLS from JLS
"Close to You", by Lovelyz from Once Upon a Time
"Close to You", by Marti Pellow from Smile
"Close to You", by Neon Trees from Picture Show
"Close to You", by Rihanna from Anti
"Close to You", by Screaming Jets from Scam
"Close to You", by Simply Red from Love and the Russian Winter
"Close to You", written by Willie Dixon, first recorded by Muddy Waters

Other 
Close to You, a 2001 novel by Mary Jane Clark

See also
"So Close to You", a song by Marta Sánchez from Woman